Charles Hubert Le Blond (November 21, 1883 – December 30, 1958) was an American prelate of the Roman Catholic Church. He served as bishop of the Diocese of St. Joseph in Missouri from 1933 to 1956.

Biography

Early life 
Charles Le Blond was born on November 21, 1883, in Celina, Ohio, one of three children of Charles McGinley and Anne Marie (née Brennan) Le Blond. Charles McGinley was a member of the Ohio House of Representatives from 1886 to 1890.  Charles Le Blond was a grandson of U.S Representative Francis Le Blond and a cousin of Judge Frank Le Blond Kloeb. 

When Charles Le Blond was age five, the family moved to Cleveland, Ohio. He received his early education at the parochial school of St. John's Cathedral. He then attended St. Ignatius High School in Cleveland for six years, graduating in 1903. Le Blond  studied for the priesthood at St. Mary's Seminary, also in Cleveland.

Priesthood 
Le Blond was ordained a priest for the Diocese of Cleveland on June 29, 1909. His first assignment was as a curate at St. John's Cathedral, where he remained for two years. In 1911, he was named director of St. Anthony's Home for Boys. From 1912 to 1933, he served as the first diocesan director of Catholic Charities and Hospitals. During his tenure as director, he laid a foundation for the many charitable Catholic institutions in the diocese. In 1930, he was one of the delegates sent by the United States to the Pan-American Conference on Child Welfare in Lima, Peru. He also represented the National Catholic Welfare Council at the international conferences on social work in Paris, France (1928) and in Frankfurt, Germany (1932).

Bishop of St. Joseph 
On July 21, 1933, Le Blond was appointed the fourth Bishop of St. Joseph, Missouri, by Pope Pius XI. He received his episcopal consecration on September 21, 1933, from Bishop Joseph Schrembs, with Bishops James A. McFadden and Thomas O'Reilly serving as co-consecrators. He took an interest in welfare work in the city, and was active in the annual Community Chest campaigns. During his tenure as bishop, the number of priests in the diocese increased by 30%, and the Catholic population of the diocese increased by more than 3,000. Due to his failing health, he received Bishop John Cody as a coadjutor bishop in 1954 to manage the daily affairs of the diocese.

Retirement and legacy 
After governing the diocese for twenty-three years, Le Blond resigned as Bishop of St. Joseph on August 24, 1956. Following his resignation, the Diocese of St. Joseph was merged with the Diocese of Kansas City to create the Diocese of Kansas City-St. Joseph. 

Charles Le Blond died on December 30, 1958, at St. Joseph's Hospital in St. Joseph, Missouri, at age 75. Bishop LeBlond High School in St. Joseph is named in his honor.

References

1883 births
1958 deaths
People from Celina, Ohio
Roman Catholic Diocese of Cleveland
Roman Catholic bishops of Saint Joseph
20th-century Roman Catholic bishops in the United States
Catholics from Ohio